Sweet Home High School is a public high school in Sweet Home, Oregon, United States.

75 percent of Sweet Home High School students in the class of 2010 earned their diplomas on time compared to a statewide average of 66 percent of students.
The school received an Outstanding rating on its 2010 State report card.

Sweet Home High School has a  music program which includes Concert Band, Pep Band, Symphonic Choir, and Chamber Choir.

References

High schools in Linn County, Oregon
Sweet Home, Oregon
Public high schools in Oregon